The 20th edition of the Central American and Caribbean Games was held in the city of Cartagena, Colombia. The tournament began on July 15 and ended on July 30.

Host city
Main host city
Cartagena de Indias
Other host cities
Barranquilla, Colombia (bowling, cycling, football/soccer, and shooting);
Bogotá, Colombia (equestrian); 
Mexico City, Mexico (rowing); and
Santo Domingo, Dominican Republic (field hockey, modern pentathlon, racquetball and team handball).

Nations

Medal table

Sports 
There were a total of 39 sports at the games. 

 
 
 
 
 
 
 

 

 
 
Racquetball (details)

External links
 Official website
 North, Central America and Caribbean Volleyball Confederation
 Meta
 Official Results

 
CACG
Central American and Caribbean Games
International sports competitions hosted by Colombia
Central
2006 in Central American sport
2006 in Caribbean sport
Multi-sport events in Colombia
Sport in Cartagena, Colombia
July 2006 sports events in North America